Rongpo or Rangpo is a West Himalayish language spoken in Uttarakhand, India.

Geographical distribution
Rongpo is spoken in the following locations of Uttarakhand, India (Ethnologue).
Niti Valley, Joshimath tehsil, Chamoli District, Garhwal Division, Uttarakhand (in Niti, Gamshali, Bampa, and Malari villages)
Mana valley, Joshimath tehsil Chamoli District, Garhwal Division, Uttarakhand: Mana, Indradhara, Gajkoti, Pathiya-Dhantoli, Hanuman Chatti, Benakuli, and Aut.

The Marchha dialect is spoken in Mana and Niti valleys. There are a few Tolchha dialect speakers in Niti valley.

References

Languages of Uttarakhand
Endangered languages of India
West Himalayish languages